The 2017 Trofeo Città di Brescia was a professional tennis tournament played on carpet courts. It was the fourth edition of the tournament which was part of the 2017 ATP Challenger Tour. It took place in Brescia, Italy between 13 and 19 November 2017.

Singles main-draw entrants

Seeds

 1 Rankings are as of 6 November 2017.

Other entrants
The following players received wildcards into the singles main draw:
  Filippo Baldi
  Liam Caruana
  Alejandro Davidovich Fokina
  Andrea Pellegrino

The following player received entry into the singles main draw using a protected ranking:
  Farrukh Dustov

The following player received entry into the singles main draw as an alternate:
  Constant Lestienne

The following players received entry from the qualifying draw:
  Aliaksandr Bury
  Lukáš Klein
  Denis Matsukevich
  Volodymyr Uzhylovskyi

The following players received entry as lucky losers:
  Giovanni Fonio
  Luca Margaroli
  Patrik Néma

Champions

Singles

 Lukáš Lacko def.  Laurynas Grigelis 6–1, 6–2.

Doubles

 Sander Arends /  Sander Gillé def.  Luca Margaroli /  Tristan-Samuel Weissborn 6–2, 6–3.

References

Trofeo Città di Brescia
Trofeo Città di Brescia
2017 in Italian sport